The Greco-Roman light heavyweight was one of four Greco-Roman wrestling weight classes contested on the Wrestling at the 1908 Summer Olympics programme. Like all other wrestling events, it was open only to men.  The light heavyweight was the second-heaviest weight class, allowing wrestlers up to 93 kilograms (205 lb). Each nation could enter up to 12 wrestlers.

Competition format

The event was a single-elimination tournament with a bronze medal match between the semifinal losers. The final and bronze medal match were best two-of-three, while all other rounds were a single bout. Bouts were 15 minutes, unless one wrestler lost by fall (two shoulders on the ground at the same time). Other than falls, decisions were made by the judges or, if they did not agree, the referee.

Wrestlers could "take hold only from the head and not lower than the waist." The "hair, flesh, ears, private parts, or clothes may not be seized"; striking, scratching, twisting fingers, tripping, and grabbing legs were prohibited. Holds "obtained that the fear of breakage or dislocation of a limb shall cause the wrestler to give the fall" were outlawed, and particularly the double-nelson, arm up back with bar on, hammerlock, strangle, half-strangle, hang, and flying mare with palm uppermost.

Results

Standings

Bracket

References

Sources
 
 

Greco-Roman 3
Greco-Roman wrestling